Ask the StoryBots is an American live-action/animated children's television series based on the characters from the StoryBots educational website and videos. It premiered exclusively on Netflix on August 12, 2016. Originally created and produced by JibJab Bros. Studios, the StoryBots media franchise was fully acquired by Netflix in May 2019.

In its first season, the series was nominated for an Annie Awards, was a finalist for a Peabody Award, was nominated in the International category at the British Academy Children's Awards and received six nominations for the Daytime Emmy Awards, including Outstanding Preschool Children's Animated Program. It won the 2017 Daytime Emmy Award for Outstanding Interactive Media - Enhancement to a Daytime Program or Series. Its second season, which premiered on Netflix on August 24, 2018, received the Annie Award for Best Animated Television Production for Preschool Children and won two Daytime Emmy Awards for writing and directing.

Ask the StoryBots also inspired a holiday special, A StoryBots Christmas, also on Netflix, which won two Daytime Emmy Awards. Starting in its second season, Ask the StoryBots has been translated into 22 languages and is available for streaming on Netflix in 190 countries.

A third season premiered on August 2, 2019. A trailer for the new episodes was launched on YouTube ahead of the season's premiere.

More Ask The Storybots episodes are in development, which are believed to be season 4.

Plot 
The StoryBots are curious little robots who live beneath our screens. In every episode, the intrepid quintet of Beep, Bing, Bang, Boop and Bo of Team 341B go on an adventure to the human world to help answer kids’ biggest questions like “Why is the sky blue?” or “Why do I need to brush my teeth?” They deliver their answer in the end of each episode in the form of a musical video.

Cast

Main cast 
 Judy Greer as Beep Boppalot, a green StoryBot.
 Jeff Gill as Bing Badaboom, a yellow StoryBot.
 Fred Tatasciore as Bangford "Bang" Bibblebop III, a blue StoryBot.
 Gregg Spiridellis as Boop Bunklebee, a red StoryBot.
 Erin Fitzgerald as Bolina "Bo" Bumblefoot, a purple StoryBot.
 Evan Spiridellis as Harry "Hap" Hacklebee, their olive-green manager.
 Nate Theis as Hub and Bub, orange and gold StoryBots.

Additional voices 
 Lisa Donovan Lukas
 Randy Crenshaw

Episodes 
Ask the StoryBots made its first season debut with six half-hour episodes. Its second season premiered August 24, 2018 and includes eight half-hour episodes. Its third season premiered August 2, 2019 and includes eight half-hour episodes.

Series overview

Season 1 (2016)

Season 2 (2018)

Season 3 (2019)

Reception 
Ask the StoryBots has been called the "best kids' show on Netflix" by both Wired and Decider and has received positive reviews, with critics specifically citing its educational quality and its entertainment value for both children and adults. Common Sense Media wrote that “[It’s] both educational and entertaining in every scene yet is visually appealing as well as humorous enough to make both children and parents laugh out loud... While the premise of the show is to answer a child's question, the antics that the characters get themselves into are very funny, and each episode always has an educational twist without being obvious... [T]he magazine format of the show allows for things such as music videos, letter rhyming, songs, and field trips to different places."

The Domestic Geek called the show "a really fun and great way for the family to learn and laugh together," while Chico News & Review wrote that "parents and children alike will want to binge on Netflix’s new edutainment series, Ask the StoryBots... The StoryBots dive deep into the natural world, research well-rounded answers and report back through contemporary music, humor and repetition."

Accolades

Music 
The show's first season soundtrack, Ask the StoryBots: Season 1 (Music from the Original Series), was released to digital vendors in September 2016 and is currently available for download and streaming on Spotify, Apple Music, ITunes and Amazon.com. The series' second season soundtrack was released on August 31, 2018.

Spinoffs 
A companion series, StoryBots Super Songs, premiered on October 7, 2016, also on Netflix. A holiday special, A StoryBots Christmas, premiered on December 1, 2017, and features Ed Asner in a guest appearance as Santa Claus. It received two Daytime Emmy Awards, including Outstanding Special Class Animated Program, with an additional four nominations.

References

External links
 
 
 Ask the StoryBots on Netflix

2010s American animated television series
2010s American children's television series
2016 American television series debuts
2019 American television series endings
American children's animated adventure television series
American computer-animated television series
American preschool education television series
American television series with live action and animation
Animated preschool education television series
2010s preschool education television series
Animated television series about extraterrestrial life
Animated television series about robots
Annie Award winners
Netflix children's programming
Animated television series by Netflix
English-language Netflix original programming